Rhoda Alice Bloodworth (22 June 1889 – 23 December 1980) was a New Zealand labour activist, community worker and feminist. She was born in Skipton, Yorkshire, England on 22 June 1889.

References

1889 births
1980 deaths
New Zealand feminists
New Zealand social workers
New Zealand activists
New Zealand women activists
British emigrants to New Zealand
People from Skipton